S. G. Vasudev (born 1941 in Mysuru, to S.K. Gopal and Rathnamma) is an alumnus of Government College of Fine Arts, Chennai and one of the longtime artists associated with Cholamandal Artists' Village. He was married to the late Arnavaz there and currently stays in Bangalore. He is one of the most prominent painters in Karnataka and has held art shows in many parts of the world and his works are in collections at various galleries. He has won many awards in India and abroad.

He was quoted on his art works in an interview: "As you know, there are a few distinct and recurring themes in my works. One of them is “Vriksha” or the Tree of Life. I in fact unknowingly discovered this theme. I was initially fascinated with the tree and painted many pictures with the tree juxtaposed with other elements. Gradually the tree moved to the center of the stage and started absorbing various elements and forms; just like the gigantic banyan tree which is so amorphous and protective.

Later I explored the essence and nature of a man-woman relationship through contrasting forms and colors. The theme of Maithuna stands for the union between the female and the male principles – the prakriti and the purusha – that exist in nature, almost in a yin-yang fusion of being. Later on, I made a series of paintings and called it – “Humanscapes”, “Earthscapes”, and “Theatre of Life.”"

National Gallery of Modern Art, Bangalore held the retrospective exhibition of Vasudev spanning over 30 years of his works in September, 2018 which was curated by Sadanand Menon

Notes

External link

Vasudevart

References 
1.https://www.thehindu.com/entertainment/art/through-the-line-lightly-sg-vasudev-looks-back-on-a-lifetime-of-art-retrospective-inner-resonance/article26181966.ece

2.https://indianexpress.com/article/lifestyle/art-and-culture/primeval-tales-of-the-earth-artist-sg-vasudev-exhibition-5813709/

3.https://www.theweek.in/theweek/leisure/2018/09/21/s-g-vasudev-copper-memoir.html

4.https://www.mid-day.com/articles/canvasses-of-artist-sg-vasudev-on-show-at-the-ngma-mumbai/21257151

5.https://www.financialexpress.com/lifestyle/a-return-to-sama-sg-vasudevs-retrospective-exhibition-tracks-his-journey-so-far/1323069/

6.https://www.outlookindia.com/newsscroll/retrospective-show-on-sg-vasudevs-art-to-open-in-bengaluru/1372116

Living people
1941 births
Artists from Mysore
Painters from Karnataka